is a Japanese manga artist. After she graduated from Tokyo University of the Arts, she created two one-shots before launching her first full series, a manga adaptation of She and Her Cat. Following its completion, she launched Blue Period.

Biography
Tsubasa Yamaguchi was born on June 26 in Tokyo. After graduating from Tokyo University of the Arts, she published two one-shots in Good! Afternoon. In 2016, she launched her first full series in Monthly Afternoon, which was a manga adaptation of Makoto Shinkai's She and Her Cat.

On June 17, 2017, she launched her second series, titled Blue Period, in Monthly Afternoon. In 2019, Yamaguchi got married. In the same year, Blue Period was nominated for the Manga Taishō and the Kodansha Manga Award in the general category. In 2020, Blue Period won the Manga Taishō and the Kodansha Manga Award in the general category. It was also nominated for the Tezuka Osamu Cultural Prize in 2020. An anime television series adaptation of the series aired in October 2021.

On January 27, 2022, it was announced Yamaguchi had tested positive for COVID-19.

Works

Series
 (serialized in Monthly Afternoon) (2016)
 (serialized in Monthly Afternoon) (2017–present)

One-shots
 (published in Good! Afternoon) (2015)
 (published in Good! Afternoon) (2015)

Other
 (light novel illustrations) (2020)

References

External links
 Official website  
 

Living people
Manga artists from Tokyo
Manga Taishō
Tokyo University of the Arts alumni
Winner of Kodansha Manga Award (General)
Women manga artists
Year of birth missing (living people)